Travis Lamont DeCuire (born November 21, 1970) is the men's basketball head coach for the University of Montana.

Biography
DeCuire went to Mercer Island High School, where he led the school to two conference titles. He began his collegiate career at Chaminade, where he was a starter his freshman year. DeCuire played college basketball for Montana from 1991 to 1994. He set school career and single-season assists records with 435 and 199 assists, respectively, for the Grizzles. DeCuire was named to All-Big Sky teams in his junior and senior seasons. He graduated from Montana in 1994 with a degree in marketing.

After graduation, DeCuire founded the Fastbreak Basketball Association to help Seattle area youth learn life lessons through basketball. He has counseled students at the Echo Glen Children's Center in Snoqualmie, Washington, from 1996 to 1998 and with the Ryther Children's Center in Seattle from 1995 to 1997. DeCuire served as head coach of Green River Community College for two seasons from 2001 to 2003. He earned league Coach of the Year honors in 2003. DeCuire left to join Blaine Taylor's staff at Old Dominion University, where he served until 2008. He helped lead the Monarchs to two NCAA Tournament berths. DeCuire was an assistant coach at the University of California for six seasons, from 2008 to 2014.

On May 31, 2014, DeCuire was hired as head coach of his alma mater, Montana. He replaced Wayne Tinkle, who left to take the job at Oregon State University. "I am excited to have Travis return to the University of Montana and lead the Griz men's basketball program," said athletic director Kent Haslam. "I identified Travis as a very strong candidate early in the search process. The more time I spent with him understanding his vision not only for our program, but for the student-athletes he will mentor, the more impressed I became with him as a person and a coach."

DeCuire was named Big Sky Coach of the Year in 2018 after leading the team to a 23–7 regular season record and Big Sky Championship title.

Head coaching record

References

1970 births
Living people
American men's basketball coaches
American men's basketball players
Basketball coaches from Washington (state)
Basketball players from Seattle
California Golden Bears men's basketball coaches
Chaminade Silverswords men's basketball players
College men's basketball head coaches in the United States
High school basketball coaches in the United States
Junior college men's basketball coaches in the United States
Montana Grizzlies basketball coaches
Montana Grizzlies basketball players
Old Dominion Monarchs men's basketball coaches
People from Wahpeton, North Dakota
Sportspeople from Seattle
Mercer Island High School alumni